Magdalena Island may refer to:

Magdalena Island, Magallanes Region, Chile, situated in the Strait of Magellan, forming part of The Penguins Natural Monument
Magdalena Island, Aysén Region, Chile, located between the Moraleda Channel and the Puyuhuapi Channel, which belongs partially to the Isla Magdalena National Park
Magdalena Island, Magdalena Bay, Baja California Sur, Mexico

See also
 Magdalen Islands